V. Balaji (born 1958) is an Indian violinist who performs both Hindustani classical music and Carnatic music. Presently he is a Professor of Violin at Banaras Hindu University, eventually became the Head and the Dean of the Instrumental department.

Early life and training
Balaji started playing violin at age three. By the age of nine, he was a professional musician. Dr. V. Balaji is a well-known artiste of Violin, Viola & Vocal,  belonging to the family of musicians. His training in Carnatic Music began when he was only five years old under the watchful supervision of his grandfather Late Shri V. N. Krishna Iyengar and his father Late Shri V. K. Venkata Ramanujam. In 1975 Balaji began to study Hindustani Music at Banaras Hindu University under the tutelage of Professor (Smt) N.Rajam and received his doctoral degree in 1986.

Performing career
He has also worked at All India Radio from 1983 to 1993 (Varanasi – Lucknow). Dr. Balaji's technique and innovations reflect near perfection. With guidance of his father and guru Sri. V. K. Venkata Ramanujam and Dr. Smt. N. Rajam, he was trained in the Gayaki Ang (vocal style). V. Balaji has performed across the globe and in numerous places throughout India.

Balaji won the Merit Scholarship for Securing First in both Bachelor's and master's degree B.H.U.in eighties. He is also the recipient of the prestigious National Scholarship Award and the Senior Fellowship Award – Department  of Culture - Government of India -  New Delhi.

Awards
 Doyen of the music world - Sri Lanka 
 Sangeet Natak Akademi Award UP, 
 Chhatrapati Shivaji Award,
 Lifetime Achievement Award, 
 I.S.C.L.O. Award,
 City Pushpa Award, 
 Professional Excellency Award- Rotary Club, 
 Amrita Mahotsava – Sanskar Bharti

Titles
 Kashi Kala Ratna,
 Kashi Ratna Alankarna,
 Sangeeta SriRatnam,
 Sangeeta Bhushanam,
 Sangeeta Vibhuti,
 Sangeeta Sudhakara,
 Navarasa Vachaspati,
 Sangeeta Ratna

Books contain a chapter about his life and works
 Ethnomusicology of the individual Vishnuchittan Balaji between Tradition and Innovativeness - Svanibor Pettan and Lasanthi Manaranjanie Kalinga Dona - Slovenia,
 Kashi ki Sangeet- Parampara sangeet jagat ko Kashi ka yogdaan- Pt. Kameshwarnath Mishra, 
 Bhartiya saangeetik jagat mein Varanasi ka yogdaan- Dr. Renu Johari, 
 Pt. Omkarnath ji Thakur evam unki shishya Parampara- Dr. Lavanya Kirti Singh ‘Kavya’, 
Strings Magazine, U.S.A. - Mr. James Wimmer, 
 Prof. Karen Schlimp – Vienna University, Austria, 
 Henrik Østergaard – violinist of Denmark, 
 Krishna Tiwari – Switzerland.

Documentary film 
 A Documentary Film on him & his Friend cum Disciple Gilles Apap Teaching Method of  Indian Music as well as Western Music along with many more Eminent Artist  of Our Country as well as Western Musician in French Language "Renegade Fiddler" – Apap masala Directed by Max Jourdan, Production : Ideal audience, 6 Rue de I agent Bally 75009 Paris year 2002.
 "Raga – Ranga" – Surabhi – National Telecast – T.V. Serial – Mumbai.

Book published 
 "Swara Shringarawali" - 2010 
 "Bhartiya Shastriya Sangeet Ki Do Dharaon Ka Ek Roopi Sanga"

Discography
 Comparative Playing (Violin) of North Indian Music & Carnatic Music – Kavi Alexender, Waterlily Acoustics.
 "Raga" – Cassettes – Violin Solo North Indian Style of Indian Music –  California.
 Rereleased in CD of Raga Yaman 2010
 Raga Bhimpalasi (Dedicated to Pt. Madan Mohan Malviya Ji on the occasion of 150th Malviya Jayanti 2010)

References
 http://www.allthingsstrings.com/layout/set/print/News/Interviews-Profiles/Dreamscape-A-Fiddler-Is-Seduced-by-the-Ancient-Arts
 https://www.youtube.com/watch?v=pNwmreemfKo
 https://www.youtube.com/watch?v=ihJo7oy4__Y
 https://www.youtube.com/watch?v=FAIlF0dUw_8
 https://www.youtube.com/watch?v=EPiBbS08DSg
 https://www.youtube.com/watch?v=KLDvsXA83as

1958 births
Hindustani instrumentalists
Indian violinists
Living people
Musicians from Chennai
Recipients of the Sangeet Natak Akademi Award
Tamil musicians
Academic staff of Banaras Hindu University
Indian music educators
21st-century violinists